Michael Tucker (born February 6, 1945) is an American author and actor, widely known for his role in the television series L.A. Law (1986–1994), for which he received two Golden Globe nominations and three Primetime Emmy Award nominations.

Life and career
Tucker was born in Baltimore, Maryland, and is a graduate of the Baltimore City College High School in Baltimore and Carnegie Institute of Technology in Pittsburgh, Pennsylvania, where he befriended Steven Bochco, executive-producer of NBC television's L.A. Law.

Tucker's acting experience includes early appearances with Joseph Papp and a major stint at the Arena Theatre, in Washington, D.C. He also has worked with Lina Wertmüller, Woody Allen, and Barry Levinson.

Tucker co-starred in L.A. Law as Stuart Markowitz along with his wife, Jill Eikenberry, who portrayed the character Ann Kelsey.

Both he and Eikenberry are active in fund-raising for breast cancer research and treatment.

Tucker has written three books, including Living in a Foreign Language: A Memoir of Food, Wine, and Love in Italy, which describes his buying a house in a small Italian village and mastering the fine art of Italian cooking. He is the author of Notes From A Culinary Wasteland, a blog about food, travel and the good life.

After meeting artist Emile Norman, Eikenberry and Tucker purchased land from him to become his neighbors in Big Sur, California. In 2006, they produced a PBS documentary entitled Emile Norman: By His Own Design.

In March 2015 Tucker co-starred with Eikenbery in The M Spot, a play written by Tucker and presented at the New Jersey Repertory Company.

Filmography: television and film
1971: They've Killed President Lincoln
1978: A Night Full of Rain 
1978: An Unmarried Woman - as Fred
1978: Eyes of Laura Mars - as Bert
1979: Vampire - as Christopher Bell
1981-1984: Hill Street Blues - as Gabe Fimpel/Mr. Heidel
1982: Diner - as Bagel
1984: The Goodbye People
1985: The Purple Rose of Cairo - as Gil's Agent
1985: The Animal Alphabet - as Geoffrey Giraffe (voice)
1986-1994: L.A. Law - as Stuart Markowitz
1987: Assault and Matrimony - as Edgar
1987: Radio Days - as father
1987: Tin Men - as Bagel
1988: Mickey's 60th Birthday - Stuart Markowitz
1989: Day One - as Leo Szilard
1989: The Tracey Ullman Show - as Jo-Jo's Father
1990: Casey's Gift: For Love of a Child - as Peter Ctilwell
1990: Too Young to Die? - as Buddy Thornton
1990: The Secret Life of Archie's Wife
1991: In the Nick of Time - as Ben Talbot
1992: A Town Torn Apart - as Dennis "Doc" Littky
1993: Tracey Ullman Takes on New York - as Harry Rosenthal
1993: For Love or Money - as Harry Wegman
1994: D2: The Mighty Ducks - as Don Tibbles
1996, 1998-99: Tracey Takes On... - as Harry Rosenthal 
1997: 'Til There Was You - as Saul Moss
2000: Growing Up Brady - as Sherwood Schwartz
2002: L.A. Law: The Movie - as Stuart Markowitz
2009: Cold Souls - as Theater Director
2010: Law & Order - as Nelson Lehman

Bibliography
1995: I Never Forget a Meal: An Indulgent Reminiscence
2007: Living in a Foreign Language: A Memoir of Food, Wine, and Love
2009: Family Meals: Coming Together to Care for an Aging Parent
2012: After Annie: A Novel

Productions
2006: Emile Norman: By His Own Design - PBS documentary produced with wife Jill Eikenberry
2015: The M Spot - A play written by Tucker and starring him and his wife, Jill Eikenberry

References

External links
 
 
 

1945 births
Living people
Male actors from Baltimore
American male film actors
American male television actors
Baltimore City College alumni
American male voice actors
20th-century American male actors
21st-century American male actors
Carnegie Mellon University College of Fine Arts alumni